The music of Colombia is an expression of Colombian culture, music genres, both traditional and modern, according with the features of each geographic region, although it is not uncommon to find different musical styles in the same region. The diversity in musical expressions found in Colombia can be seen as the result of a mixture of Amerindian, African, and European (especially Spanish) influences, as well as more modern American.

Colombia has a vibrant collage of talent that touches a full spectrum of rhythms ranging from Pop music and Classical music to Salsa and Rock music. Colombian music is promoted mainly by the support of the largest record labels, independent companies and the Government of Colombia, through the Ministry of Culture.

Caribbean region

Colombia is known as "The land of a thousand rhythms" but actually holds over 1,025 folk rhythms. Some of the best known genres are cumbia and vallenato. The most recognized interpreters of traditional Caribbean and Afrocolombian music are Totó la Momposina and Francisco Zumaqué.

Western Caribbean Region

Cumbia 

Cumbia began as a courtship dance practiced among the African population on the Caribbean coasts of Colombia. It is a mixture of Spanish, Native Colombian and African music. The style of dance is designed to recall the shackles worn around the ankles of the slaves. In the 19th century, slavery was abolished and Africans, Indians and other ethnic groups got a more complete integration in the Colombian culture.

Cumbia is a complex, rhythmic music which arose on Colombia's Atlantic coast. In its original form, cumbia bands included only percussion and vocals; modern groups include saxophones, trumpets, keyboards and trombones as well. It evolved out of native influences, combining both traditions. Some observers have claimed that the dance originally associated with iron chains around the ankle. Others still believe that it is a direct import from Guinea, which has a popular dance form called cumbe.

Cumbia's form was solidified in the 1940s when it spread from the rural countryside to urban and middle-class audiences. Mambo, big band and porro brass band influences were combined by artists like Lucho Bermúdez to form a refined form of cumbia that soon entered the Golden Age of Cumbia during the 1950s. Discos Fuentes, the largest and most influential record label in the country, was founded during this time. Fruko, known as the Godfather of Salsa, introduced Cuban salsa to Colombia and helped bring Discos Fuentes to national prominence by finding artists like La Sonora Dinamita, who brought cumbia to Mexico, where it remains popular.

It is worth pointing out that the "classic" cumbia known throughout Colombia is the Cumbia Cienaguera. This song reflects a uniquely Colombian feel known as "sabor" (flavour) and "ambiente" (atmosphere). Arguably, this song has remained a Colombian staple through the years and is widely known as Colombia's unofficial national anthem. Some artists are Los Gaiteros de San Jacinto, Los Graduados, Los Black Stars, Los Golden Boys, Los Teen Agers, and Los Corraleros de Majagual. In the United States, an Afro- Colombian band based in New York called Grupo Rebolu, performs a variety of Afro-Colombian rhythms with authentic instruments such as Tambora and Tambor Alegre. Their repertoire includes Cumbia and many more genres from the Northern coast of Colombia as part of their original compositions.

Champeta and African-diasporic music
Some Colombian communities, such as Chocó, Cartagena, San Andres and Providence Island, have large African-descendant communities. Unlike most of the country, cultural mixing with native and European influences have been rare, and, especially in El Chocó, music has changed little since being imported from West Africa. Providencia Island is also home to a type of folk music which is closely related to mento, a Jamaican folk form. Most influentially, however, is the city of Cartagena and its champeta music which has been influenced by soukous, compas, zouk, and reggae. Champeta musicians have included Luis Towers, El Afinaíto, El Sayayín, El Pupy, and Boogaloo, while others like Elio Boom have incorporated Jamaican raggamuffin music to champeta.

Porro

Porro bands are a form of big band music that came from Sucre, Córdoba and Sabana de Bolívar. The brass ensembles are modeled after European military bands. Notable porros include Pacho Galan.

Eastern Caribbean musical region

Vallenato

Vallenato was first played by the pre-Columbian Indians using traditional instruments. The first vallenato singer was Guillermo Buitrago, born in the Magdalena department. Vallenato did not always use accordion as its main instrument. In fact, from 1920 to 1936 the main instrument was the guitar. Groups such as bovea and sus vallenatos also are among the first vallenato singers. They form the group in the city of Barranquilla Atlantico department. They also were the first to take the vallenato music to a different country like Argentina, specifically in northern Argentina.
Contrary to popular belief, vallenato is not a rhythm. Rather, it is a genre. It is made up of four rhythms: Son, Puya, Merengue, and Paseo. Vallenato arose in Valledupar on Colombia's Atlantic Coast and only gained popularity elsewhere in the country in the 1980s. Its origins are shrouded in mystery but are said to have begun with Francisco el Hombre, who allegedly defeated Satan in a musical contest. Based around the accordion, the guacharaca, and the caja vallenata (a larger version of the bongo), vallenato has long been connected with cumbia. Influential artists include Alejo Duran and more recently, Alfredo Gutiérrez and Lisandro Meza. In addition to the accordion, the bass guitar has been a common part of vallenato ensembles since it was introduced by Caliya in the mid-1960s. The most recent modernization of vallenato occurred in 1993 when Carlos Vives released Clásicos de la Provincia, which made him into a star and changed the face of vallenato.

An important phenomenon has occurred in Colombia with vallenato. At first it was an exclusive kind of music for Atlantic Coast people but because the proliferation of radio programs of this genre in other cities of the republic (such as Bogota), and the migration of people from the coast to the capital, vallenato spread to the rest of Colombia. Not only the music, but the musicians of the genre increased in the capital and other cities. In 2006 for the first time, a musician from Bogota, Alberto "Beto" Jamaica, was the king of vallenato in the traditional competition to play accordion, "El Festival Vallenato". Other important musicians from other cities have taken importance in the vallenato world.

Vallenato has spawned several subgenres, including vallenato-protesta, which is known for socially aware lyrics, and charanga vallenata, which was invented by Cubans in the United States like progenitor Roberto Torres.

Other Caribbean genres

 Chalupa
 Champeta
 Chande
 Cumbión
 Bullerengue
 Décimas
 Fandango
 Gaita
 Lumbalú
 Mapalé
 Maya
 Merecumbé
 Mode Up/Mud Up
 Pajarito
 Parrandí
 Pilón
 Pompo
 Porro
 Puya
 Son Sabanero
 Son Palenquero
 Tambora
 Tamborito

Pacific Region of Colombia

Currulao
This is one of the most African influenced-styles in all of Colombia, and has its roots among the Afro-Colombian/African-descendant/Black people of the Pacific coast.

In its most basic form, the currulao is played by a group of four musicians.

One musician plays a 6-8 rhythm on a drum known as a "cununo", which superficially resembles the "alegre" drum (used in Cumbia) to the untrained eye, but is narrower and taller. The Currulao rhythm is created by both striking the skin of the drum with the one's hand and tapping the side of the drum with a small stick.

The second musician keeps time on a shaker known in parts of Colombia as a "guasá"(goo-ah-SAH) or "guache"(goo-AH-cheh), which is typically a hollow cylinder made of metal, wooden, or guadua bamboo, filled with light seeds, rice is sometimes used in home-made guasás.

But the main instrument of the currulao style is perhaps the Colombian marimba, a wooden xylophone which resembles the African balafon also for the style of playing.

Many groups in Colombia perform this traditional style of music. Currently, the most renowned groups include Grupo Socavón, Grupo Gualajó, and Grups Bahia Trio. A well renowned figure among the old marimbero masters in Colombia is Baudilio Cuama Rentería from Buenaventura Colombia.

In the United States two Colombian Bands performing this genre with authentic traditional instruments are La Cumbiamba NY, on the east coast (New York), and Aluna Band in the west coast (San Francisco). In 2010, Currulao has been added to the UNESCO list of Masterpieces of the Oral and Intangible Heritage of Humanity.

Other Pacific genres

 Abozao
 Aguabajo
 Alabao
 Andarele o Amanecer
 Arrullo
 Bambara Negra
 Bambuco Viejo
 Berejú
 Boga
 Bunde Chocoano
 Caderona
 Calipso Chocoano
 Chigualo o Gualí
 Contradanza Chocoana
 Danza Chocoana
 Jota Chocoana
 Juga
 La Caramba
 La Madruga
 Makerule
 Mazurka chocoana
 Pango o Pangora
 Patacoré
 Polka Chocoana
 Porro Chocoano
 Pregón
 Romance
 Salve
 Saporrondón o Sapo-Rondó
 Son Chocoano
 Tamborito Chocoano
 Tiguarandó
 Villancico Chocoano

Andean Region of Colombia

Bambuco

Bambuco is a type of music with Basque and Native American influence, sometimes known as Música del interior. It is not clear the origins of this style, but many specialist agree that it has some components of Spanish folk music, while others believe it has a typical rhythm which was inherited from the Quechua or Chibchas. According to Rafael Pombo, the Bambuco orinated among the mestizo masses. Briefly, it is the result of the ethhinic mixture from the colony time, being influencing by different cultural elements. Its popularity has long been, but was extremely popular across Colombia from the mid-1920s to the late 1930s. Artists include Estudiantina, Los Carranguerros de Raquira, Jaime Llano González, Jorge Villamil, and the Morales Pino Trío.

Guabina 
Guabina is a rhythm from the Andean Mountains in Colombia. The features of this music are based on dances and lifestyles of the people from Antioquia, Santander, Boyacá, Tolima, and, Huila. The Guabina rhythm includes dancers, but it may be played without them. There is a version of the Guabina that is played faster and is called Torbellino. Another type of Guabina, known as guabina-torbellino, is a mixture of the instrumental torbellino and the sung guabina, particularly in its a cappella format. Guabina is most popular in rural communities.

Other Andean genres

 Bambuco fiestero
 Bunde
 Caña
 Cañabrava
 Carranga
 Copla
 Danza Criolla
 Porro Antioqueño

 Rajaleña
 Rumba Campesina
 Fandanguillo Criollo
 Guabina
 Guaneña
 Guasca

 Pasillo
 Sanjuanero
 Torbellino
 Vueltas Antioqueñas
 Criollo waltz

Orinoquía Region of Colombia

Joropo

Música llanera is a harp-led genre of music from the Llanos popular throughout Colombia. It includes the traditional joropo musical style, and is known for verbal contests called contrapunteo. Artists in this genre include Alfredo Rolando Ortiz (born in Cuba), Alma Llanera (Colombian band), Cimarrón (band), Luis Ariel Rey, Carlos Rojas, Sabor Llanero, Arnulfo Briceño, and Orlando Valdemarra. This particular type of music is also popular in Venezuela due to the shared llanos. It is considered to be the national music of Venezuela. Listen joropo music .

Other Orinoco region genres

 Cachicama
 Catira
 Chipola
 Contrapunteo
 Corrío
 Galerón
 Gaván
 Pasaje
 Periquera
 Perro de Agua
 Gavilan
 Guacaba
 Guacharaca
 Juana Guerrero
 Merecure
 Moña or Moño
 Pajarillo
 Poema Llanero
 Quirpa
 Seis
 Zumba-que-zumba

Insular Region (Colombia)

Musical genres

 Calipso
 Compas
 Foxtrot
 Mazurka
 Mento
 Praise Hymn
 Pasillo isleño
 Polca
 Quadrille
 Reggae
 Schottische
 Soca
 Vals isleño
 Zouk

Amazon Region of Colombia

Musical instruments 
 Guitar
 Menguaré
 Shakers
 Drum
 Tambourine

Musical genres 

 Batuques
 Carimbó
 Ciría
 Dobrado
 Lambada
 Mariquinha
 Mixtianas
 Paseata
 Porrosambas
 Tangarana
 Sirimbó
 Sanjuanito
 Huayno
 Bambuco
 Pasillo
 Sanjuanero
 Merengure Campesino
 Tonadas Indígenas

Contemporary music

Colombian salsa

Salsa music was born among Puerto Ricans and Cubans in New York, but soon spread to Colombia. Native salsa groups like Fruko y sus Tesos and labels that recorded them like Discos Fuentes emerged. Artists like Joe Arroyo followed, inventing a distinctively Colombian form of salsa. Other influential Colombian salsa artists include Cristian Del Real "The Timbal Genius", Grupo Niche, Alquimia, La Misma Gente, Los Titanes, Los Nemus del Pacífico, Orquesta Guayacán, Grupo Galé and La Sonora Carruseles. Some of the most prolific composers in the genre are Jairo Varela and Nino Caicedo whose compositions have been recorded by Grupo Niche and Orquesta Guayacán respectively. Several Cuban and Puerto Rican musicians who have established in Colombia, such as Diego Valdés and Israel Tanenbaum, have collaborated with Colombians in salsa projects. Recently Colombian dancers have become World Champions year after year and the style is becoming more popular and admired among Salsa professionals worldwide; with two of the most prominent salsa schools being Swing Latino driven by the dance choreographer Eduardo 'El Mulato' Hernandez, and Constelación Latina driven by one of the world's most beloved dancers Jhoanna 'KKO' Agudelo. As a dance, Colombian Salsa is unique and different from New York/Puerto Rico and Cuban salsa. Colombian Salsa concentrates on footwork and does not incorporate cross-body leads. Dancers leave the upper part of the body still and relaxed while the feet do extremely fast and complex movements.

Colombian rock music

In the late 1950s, Mexican rock artists like Enrique Guzmán and César Costa became very popular in Colombia. Soon, native rock bands like Los Speakers and The Flippers gained a wide following. Starting in 1967 (see 1967 in music), native bands like Génesis (unrelated to the more famous band Genesis of a similar name) fused native musical forms (like cumbia) with rock. Marco, the voice of the Rock and Roll, was a pioneer and promoter of the "Rockabilly Colombian" performed with his unmistakable personal stamp in their own language. Virtuality is in their first recordings routed to the sensitive listener to enjoy the simplicity of rock bass, guitar and drums, combined into a whole to produce a very particular and in an atmosphere of a home recording studio, filled with reel tapes and three microphones mixed in mono line. (Marco Tulio Sanchez B) contributed to the Colombian rock and roll look to the past to remember our roots, dabbling in country and rockabilly music evokes Elvis Presley, is called today the "Elvis colombiano", awarded abroad for their ability on stage as a whole "Showman" and the unmistakable voice of Cronn rocker.

Rock in Colombia gained great popularity during the 1980s with the arrival of bands such as Soda Stereo (Argentina), Los Prisioneros (Chile), and Hombres G (Spain). During the 90's, many punk and heavy metal bands appeared in Bogotá, Medellín, and Cali. Colombia has possibly the biggest underground, hardcore, metal and punk movement of the continent, and is known in Latin America as the "punk corner". Kraken and Masacre are some of the most important Colombian rock bands.

The music event Rock al Parque celebrated yearly in Bogotá is the largest free rock festival in Latin America; around 100 bands playing their music along 3 days and 400,000 people in attendance. Currently, Doctor Krápula, a rock band with strong ska influences that is known for making covers of traditional Latin American songs, enjoys great popularity. A popular Colombian Rock band outside of Colombia is The Monas. Aterciopelados named "Colombia's Hottest Band" in a Time magazine article, is one of the most recognized Rock bands of Colombia. "The band, made up of front woman Andrea Echeverri and bassist/producer Hector Buitrago, mixes punk, surf guitar and ska with folky Colombian styles such as vallenato, a bouncy, accordion-heavy genre".

Other popular and interesting bands are Ekhymosis, a group led by Juanes, who began making music in 1988 and are known for doing rock with a Colombian influence, The Hall Effect who make English pop/rock linked with Britpop influences. SOUNDACITY performs a mix of Brit rock, pop and Andean sounds, rhythms and instrumentation, sing both in English and Spanish and have toured the United States east coast. Proper Strangers is an avant-garde rock band. Two Way Analog is an eclectic band whose influence are roadmovies and its soundtracks, Divagash is an electronic soft-rock band, La Pestilencia is a post-hardcore band, Bajo Tierra, Palenke Soultribe (traditional Colombin roots music fused with electronic beats). But, possibly, the most successful "indie" band is Sidestepper, with its fusion of Colombian traditional music, electronic and African rhythms, who already appeared in Coachella Festival in 2006. Some musical groups in the death metal genre are the world-famous Internal Suffering, Carnivore Diprosopus, Goretrade, Mindly Rotten, Suppuration, and Amputated Genitals. Colombia is also the birthplace of the well known black metal band Inquisition, now based in Seattle, Washington. Miguel Fernando Trapezaris, the bassist of Cyprus-based Epic power metal band Winter's Verge, is of Colombian descent.

Colombian pop music

This musical genre has been growing recently with artists like Los de Adentro, San Alejo, Sebastian Yepes, Lucas Arnau or Mauricio & Palodeagua. Pop with strong traces of traditional Colombian music, named Tropipop, is also rising currently. Fonseca and Maía represent this trend.

Some of Colombia's most recognized pop artists 

Shakira is the highest selling and most recognized Colombian artist. After the success of her album Pies Descalzos in 1995, Shakira began working with producer Emilio Estefan Jr. and recorded Dónde Están los Ladrones?, which sold millions worldwide. Showing all her talent, after her MTV Unplugged presentation, Shakira went on to make an English album Laundry Service which debuted at #3 in the Billboard Charts of the USA.

One of her most successful songs is Hips Don't Lie, which sold over 10 million copies and downloads worldwide, topped in over 70 countries #1.

She is winner of 2 American and 7 Latin Grammies. In 2008, Shakira was nominated for a Golden Globe.

Singer-songwriter Juanes is also one of the most important singers from Colombia. He stood out at the Latin Grammys in 2003 with his album Un Día Normal, which has become very popular in the US and Europe.
Juanes is the most important Colombian artist of the last decade, as mentioned by the Billboard magazine and Colombian El Espectador newspapaer, due to the success of songs such as Fíjate Bien, A Dios le Pido, La Camisa Negra, Me Enamora and Yerbatero. His albums Fíjate Bien, Un Día Normal, Mi Sangre, La Vida es un Ratico and P.A.R.C.E. have been successful in many countries around the world. 

Juanes was chosen by CNN as a global icon and is the youngest of the list. His humanitarian activism has characterized him as a very supportive artist in the history of latin music. Since he began his musical career, Juanes has broken several records in the history of the Latin Grammys.

Fanny Lú, is also an important artist, from the southern city of Santiago de Cali. She has released three full-length albums, Lágrimas Cálidas, Dos and Felicidad y Perpetua. Her first almbum produced two hits: No Te Pido Flores and Y Si Te Digo. The second one included the hit Tú No Eres Para Mi and, more recently, Fanfarrón became a hit from her third studio album. She also serves as a Goodwill Ambassador to the United Nations.

Maía, born in the same port city as Shakira, Barranquilla, is a trilingual artist who has topped the charts with several international hits including Niña Bonita, Se Me Acabó El Amor, and Ingenuidad. From her debut album, there is El Baile de los Sueños.

Ilona, a native of Colombia's capital city, Bogotá, cut her teeth singing in the public transport bus service at the age of 15. She has released two full-length studio albums including Desde Mi Ventana and the Latin Grammy Award nominated Allá en el Sur.

Carlos Vives, a singer from the coastal city of Santa Marta, is famous for fusing classic vallenato sounds with rock music. He has collaborated with diverse international artists such as Marc Anthony and Daddy Yankee, as well as countrymen ChocQuibTown and Maluma.

Naty Botero, is a singer and composer from the city of Medellín, known for interpreting pop and Latin pop songs. Some of her main hits are Te Quiero Mucho, Dinosaurio, Mio and Adicta, among others. She have worked on musical productions with Colombian artists such as Joe Arroyo, ChocQuibTown and Andrés Cabas and artists from other countries such as Felix da Housecat. She also has a foundation called Coraje, to help the native people of the Sierra Nevada de Santa Marta.

Other famous pop singers include artists such as Soraya, Anasol, Paula Arenas, Lucas Arnau, Marbelle, Ali Stone and more recently, Sebastian Yatra.

Colombian urban and hip-hop music

Hip Hop came to Colombia in the late 1980s when a few US Hip-Hop tracks by NWA and MC Hammer spurred a break-dancing fever among the young of the less privileged areas of major cities such as Medellín, Cali and Bogotá. Towards the end of this decade groups began to form, eventually leading to complete album productions in the mid-1990s. La Etnnia and Gotas de Rap were two of the various hip-hop groups that emerged and are widely considered as the pioneers of Colombian Rap. Promoting a very independent style, both groups expressed extreme political and social views, protesting violence, corruption, inequality and hardships in the marginalized regions of Colombia. Then Asilo 38 from Cali come onto the scene with the albums, La Hoguera (2000) and La Descarga (2002), presenting a more commercial and polished sound, while still retaining strong socio-political messages. It is about this time that 
Reggaeton from Puerto Rico surges in popularity and Hip-Hop in Colombia takes a back seat for a while as artists try their hand at the new controversial sound. Artist(s) such as Tres Pesos, J Balvin, Maluma, Reykon y Yelsid have established themselves in this genre and hits such as 'Baila (Negra de trasero grande)' by Leka el Poeta and the explixcitly worded 'La Quemona' and 'Micaela' by Master Boy take the country by storm. Even the first ever Colombian 'X Factor' in 2006 produces a Reggaeton singer called Farina Pao Paucar Franco who places third in the competition.

Karol G is a Colombian reggaetón singer who has done collaborations with other reggaetón singers, such as J Balvin, Bad Bunny, and Maluma. Throughout her career, Karol G has had troubles in the industry because reggaetón is a genre that is dominated by male artists. She recounts how when starting her career she noticed that there weren't many opportunities for her in the genre because reggaeton was dominated by male artists. In 2018, Karol G’s single Mi Cama became very popular and she made a remix with J Balvin and Nicky Jam. The Mi cama remix appeared in the top 10 Hot Latin Songs and number 1 in Latin Airplay charts. This year she has collaborated with Maluma called Creeme and with Anuel AA in Culpables. The single, Culpables has been in the top 10 Hot Latin Songs for 2 consecutive weeks.

Reggae has always been popular in the Colombian Caribbean islands of San Andres and Providence and Spanish Reggae from Panama has helped to strengthen the movement of Reggae artists in the Colombian interior. Artists such as Voodoo Soul Jah, Nawal and Alerta Kamarada (Colombian representatives in the Jamaican Reggae festival) are currently spearheading this ever more popular genre in Colombia. 2006 brings a renaissance in Colombian Hip-Hop in the form of Afro-Colombian group ChocQuibTown, fusing traditional rhythms and instruments from their native lands in the Colombian Pacific into their sound. Already hailed as the new phenemomenon in Colombian Hip-Hop, their popularity is ever increasing and making way for other Urban artists to emerge. One such artist is Jiggy Drama, from the island of San Andres, who has become one of the most loved and controversial rap artist in Colombia, his lyrics are spicy and intelligent. Jiggy Drama collaborated with Colombian Party Cartel on the urban merengue track "Chico Malo". *On the international stage Aztek Escobar based in Houston, Colombian Party Cartel based in Nashville, Tres Coronas based in New York, Adassa based in Miami and 3 of the seven-man group of Culcha Candela in Berlin, Germany are representing Colombian urban music worldwide.

See also

 Glossary of Colombian music
 Colombian rock
 Muisca music

References

Other sources
 Brill, Mark. Music of Latin America and the Caribbean, 2nd Edition, 2018. Taylor & Francis 
 Burton, Kim. "El Sonido Dorado". 2000. In Broughton, Simon and Ellingham, Mark with McConnachie, James and Duane, Orla (Ed.), World Music, Vol. 2: Latin & North America, Caribbean, India, Asia and Pacific, pp 372–385. Rough Guides Ltd, Penguin Books.

External links

  Audio clips: Traditional music of the Colombia. Musée d'ethnographie de Genève. Accessed November 25, 2010.
 Antipoda.net
 Soundacity.net
 A small trip through Colombian music A small trip through the music of the natural regions of Colombia including pictures of the different instruments and music samples.
 Sounds and Colours South American music and culture magazine, with plenty of features on Colombian music.
 Listen llanera music
 Listen Colombian Party Cartel music
 Listen Jiggy Drama music

 
Latin American music